Die Marx-Engels-Gesamtausgabe (MEGA) is the largest collection of the writing of Karl Marx and Friedrich Engels in any language. It is an ongoing project intended to produce a critical edition of the complete works of Marx and Engels that reproduces the extant writings of both authors in books of high-quality paper and library binding. 

Being a scholarly and academic, historical-critical edition, most MEGA volumes consist of separate text and appendix books, the latter giving additional information on the edited text. All material in MEGA is edited in the original language, resulting in mostly German- but also a considerable quantity of English- as well as French-language texts.

Initiated by the Institutes of Marxism-Leninism of the SED in Berlin and the CPSU in Moscow and published by Dietz Verlag (Berlin) as a series launched in 1975, MEGA contains all works published by Marx and Engels in their lifetimes and numerous previously unpublished manuscripts and letters. 

After the fall of the Berlin Wall, publishing of MEGA was transferred to the Internationale Marx-Engels-Stiftung (IMES) in Amsterdam. The volumes are printed and bound by Walter de Gruyter in Berlin. The project is presently being overseen by Gerald Hubmann.

Sixty-five volumes of MEGA have been published so far. All volumes containing writings related to Das Kapital have been published. Most recently a text volume and accompanying apparatus volume containing Marx's ecological writings was published. The entire project is expected to be 114 volumes in total.

Publication history

Background
The MEGA of today was not the first attempt to publish a complete collection of the works of Karl Marx and Friedrich Engels in their original language.

First MEGA 
In the 1920s and 1930s a first MEGA or MEGA1 began being published by the Marx-Engels Institute in Moscow under the direction of David Riazanov, a Marxist scholar and revolutionary. MEGA1 was originally intended to comprise 42 volumes, of which 12 volumes were published between 1927 and 1935. After Riazanov was removed as director of the Marx-Engels Institute in February 1931 (and killed in a perfunctory trial in 1938) and Hitler rose to power in Germany in 1933, MEGA1 was silently discontinued.

Second MEGA 
Only after Stalin's death was a second attempt undertaken in the 1960s. The cooperation between German and Soviet editors, new editorial guidelines and innovative concepts led to the publication of a first sample volume in 1972, followed by the first volume of the new, second MEGA (or MEGA2) in 1975.

Structure
MEGA contains material written by Marx between 1835 and his death in 1883, and by Engels between 1838 and his death in 1895. The project is divided into four general sections:

I. Abteilung (Werke, Artikel, Entwürfe) 

All philosophical, economic, historical and political works, publications, articles and speeches of Marx and Engels. Well-known works of Marx and Engels, including The German Ideology (volume I/5), The Class Struggles in France 1848-1850 (volume I/10), The Eighteenth Brumaire of Louis Napoleon (volume I/11), Critique of the Gotha Program (volume I/25) and Anti-Dühring (volume I/27) are part of this section. It will comprise 32 volumes.

II. Abteilung (Das Kapital und Vorarbeiten) 

This section contains Marx's major work, Capital: Critique of Political Economy (with all three volumes), and all the economic works and manuscripts related to it, beginning with the Grundrisse from 1857/58 (volume II/1). This section is so far the only completed one, it was finished with volume II/4.3 in 2012 and comprises 15 volumes in 23 books.

III. Abteilung (Briefwechsel) 

The complete correspondence of Marx and Engels, both the exchange of letters between each other, as well as from Marx and Engels to third persons, whose letters to both authors are also completely printed in the edition. The section will comprise 35 volumes.

IV. Abteilung (Exzerpte, Notizen, Marginalien) 

The previously largely unpublished excerpts, notes and marginalia of Marx and Engels. The section will comprise 32 volumes.

Plan
Since 1990 MEGA is being published by the Internationale Marx-Engels-Stiftung (IMES) in Amsterdam. 

The IMES is an international network of the International Institute of Social History, the Berlin-Brandenburgische Akademie der Wissenschaften (BBAW), the Karl-Marx-Haus (KMH) of the Friedrich Ebert Foundation in Trier, the Russian State Archive for Social/Political History (RGA) and the Russian Independent Institute for the Study of Social and National Problems (RNI), the latter two in Moscow. The main task of the IMES is to continue the publication of the Marx-Engels-Gesamtausgabe.

All further volumes of the first and important volumes of the fourth section will, however, still be published in printed form.

See also
 Marx/Engels Collected Works (MECW)
 Marx-Engels-Werke (MEW)

Footnotes

External links
 Official website of BBAW for the MEGA project
 Website of the Berliner Verein zur Förderung der MEGA-Edition e.V. (Berlin society for assistance of the MEGA edition) (German)
 Information on MEGA on the website of Marx. Dialectical Studies
 Table of contents of MEGA1, 13 vols.

Political books
20th-century books
Marxist works
Books by Karl Marx and Friedrich Engels